Chlorobenzonitrile may refer to:
 2-Chlorobenzonitrile
 3-Chlorobenzonitrile
 4-Chlorobenzonitrile
 2,6-Dichlorobenzonitrile